Jean-Paul DuChamp, typically referred to as Frenchie, is a fictional character appearing in American comic books published by Marvel Comics. He is primarily seen as the pilot and sidekick to Moon Knight.

Publication history
The character first appeared in Werewolf by Night #32, in August 1975, which also featured the first appearance of Moon Knight. The character would next appear in The Defenders issue 49, in July 1977, becoming a recurring character in the 1980 Moon Knight series, and the 1989 series Marc Spector: Moon Knight. The character also played a significant role in the 2006 Moon Knight series and was also featured in the 2009 series Vengeance of the Moon Knight. The character would later reappear in the 2016 Moon Knight series where he is one of the mental patients in an insane asylum in New York City alongside Marc Spector, Bertand Crawley, Gena Landers, Marlene Alraune and others.

Fictional character biography
Frenchie was originally romantically involved with a woman named Isabelle Kristel, but she later left him. After this, he became a mercenary, where he encountered Marc Spector and Raoul Bushman. Once Spector became Moon Knight, Frenchie helped him fight Bushman, who had betrayed them. He would later design and build Moon Knight’s Mooncopter.

Frenchie then went undercover in order to infiltrate the crime organization the Committee, under the alias Monsieur LeBlanc, which allowed Moon Knight to bring down the organization.

Frenchie was later crippled when Moon Knight’s brother Randall Spector caused an explosion at Moon Knight’s mansion. His girlfriend Chloe Tran also informed him that he carried the bloodline of the Hellbent, a race of supernatural beings, and that he has the ability to transform into his ancestors.

After being driven away by Moon Knight, Frenchie became partners with Rob Silverman, and they opened and ran a restaurant called En Table. It is revealed he is gay, and was attracted to Marc. Norman Osborn learned that Frenchie was an associate of Moon Knight, and sent a gang to kill him and Silverman in order to provoke Moon Knight. The attack left Silverman in critical condition, which caused Frenchie and Moon Knight to again join forces and attack the gang who attacked them.
 
In his most recent appearance, Frenchie is called on by Moon Knight to watch over Marc’s daughter, Diatrice Alraune.

Powers and abilities
Frenchie is a skilled pilot and an above average hand-to-hand combatant.

In other media
 Frenchie is featured as an ally in the Moon Knight virtual pinball game for Pinball FX 2 released by Zen Studios.
 DuChamp's (spelled Duchamp) name appears in the first episode of Moon Knight when Steven Grant finds a phone that belonged to Marc Spector in his flat and checks his missed calls.

References

External links
 Frenchie at Marvel.com
 Frenchie at Marvel Wiki
 Frenchie at Comic Vine
 

Marvel Comics male characters
1975 comics debuts
Marvel Comics LGBT characters
Fictional French people
Marvel Comics sidekicks
Fictional aviators
Characters created by Doug Moench
Characters created by Don Perlin
Comics characters introduced in 1975